Karapınar (literally Black fountain) is a Turkish place name. It may refer to:

Places
Karapınar, a district in Konya Province, Turkey
Karapınar, Alanya, a village in Alanya district of Antalya Province, Turkey
Karapınar, Bismil
Karapınar, Çal
Karapınar, Çanakkale
Karapınar, Çaycuma, a village in Çaycuma district of Zonguldak Province, Turkey
Karapınar, Çorum
Karapınar, Dursunbey, a village
Karapınar, Gölhisar
Karapınar, Horasan
Karapınar, Haymana, a village in Haymana district of Ankara Province, Turkey
Karapınar, Hekimhan, a village in Hekimhan district of Malatya Province, Turkey
Karapınar, Karakoçan
Karapınar, Kemaliye
Karapınar, Kuyucak, a village in Kuyucak district of Aydın Province, Turkey
Karapınar (Malatya), a village in Hekimhan district of Malatya Province, Turkey
Karapınar, Mustafakemalpaşa
Karapınar, Narman
Karapınar, Ortaköy, a village in Ortaköy district of Aksaray Province, Turkey
Karapınar, Polatlı, a village in Polatlı district of Ankara Province, Turkey
Karapınar, Savaştepe, a village
Karapınar, Sultandağı, a town in Sultandağ district of Afyonkarahisar Province, Turkey
Karapınar, Vezirköprü, a village in Vezirköprü district of Samsun Province, Turkey
Karapınar, Zonguldak, a village in central district of Zonguldak Province, Turkey

Other uses 
Karapınar coal mine, a coal mine in Karapınar district of Konya Province, Turkey
Karapınar Field, a volcanic field  in Karapınar, Konya Province, Turkey
Karapınar Renewable Energy Resource Area, a proposed solar energy plant in Karapınar, Konya Province, Turkey